"A Walk to Caesarea" (Halika LeKeisarya), also commonly known by the opening words "Eli, Eli" ("My God, My God") in the song version, is a poem in Hebrew written in 1942 by Hungarian Jewish WWII resistance fighter Hannah Szenes, which Israeli composer David Zehavi set to music in 1945. Szenes wrote the poem while residing in kibbutz Sdot Yam which is located a short distance along the Mediterranean coast from the ancient port town of Caesarea.

The song is considered one of Israel's unofficial anthems, and is the most-commonly played song on Yom HaShoah (the Holocaust Remembrance Day) in Israel.

The following is an English translation of the song version:

My God, my God,
may it never end –
the sand and the sea,
the rustle of the water,<br
>
the lightning of the sky,
the prayer of man.

In Hebrew, the poem reads:

אלי, אלי, שלא יגמר לעולם
החול והים
רשרוש של המים
ברק השמים
תפילת האדם

References

External links

Sophie Milman Version of Eli, Eli

Songs about Israel

Songs about cities
Hebrew-language songs
Israeli songs
1942 poems